The St. Paul Saints were an amateur and later professional ice hockey team from Saint Paul, Minnesota that played in various American leagues during the first half of the 20th century, among them the United States Amateur Hockey Association (1920–1925) and the American Hockey Association (1926–1930 and 1935–1942). Originally known as the St. Paul Athletic Club the team started out around the 1914–15 season.

The first time ice hockey made its way to the Olympic Games, for the 1920 Summer Olympics in Antwerp, Belgium, the St. Paul Athletic Club/Saints had four of its members on the silver medal winning American team: Cy Weidenborner, Ed Fitzgerald, Moose Goheen and Tony Conroy.

Notable players
Moose Goheen – Hockey Hall of Fame inductee
Taffy Abel – United States Hockey Hall of Fame inductee
Gerry Geran
Joe McCormick
Percy Galbraith
Cully Wilson

References

Notes

American Hockey Association (1926–1942) teams
Defunct ice hockey teams in Minnesota
Ice hockey teams in Minnesota
United States Amateur Hockey Association teams